Hilton is a village in Cumbria, England, in the civil parish of Murton, about  east of Appleby-in-Westmorland and at an elevation of . In 1870-72 the township had a population of 253. It has a rural economy, with much grazing of sheep, though the past was also home to lead mining.

History
Hilton was the birthplace of Christopher Bainbridge (c.1464-1514), Cardinal and Archbishop of York (where he was the direct predecessor of Thomas Wolsey). Bainbridge was closely related to the local families of Langton, Machell and Blenkinsop.

By the end 19th century, Hilton had a population of around 300 in an area of 4,984 acres there were many lead mines nearby and a smelt mill was situated in the village. In 1856 the St. John the Baptist Church was constructed in the area between Hilton and Murton which features a three-tier pulpit. Since the 1980s much of the previously common land of the village has been owned by the Ministry of Defence as part of the Warcop Training Area which has been expanded extensively over the years.

Hilton Mine
Some  to the northeast of Hilton, between Hilton Fell and Murton Fell in Scordale, is the Hilton Mine . Initially it worked for galena (lead ore) in the nineteenth century by the London Lead Company, it was later worked under different owners for barium minerals, barytes and witherite in the early twentieth century. It also was a rare source of yellow coloured fluorite in the UK.

See also

Listed buildings in Murton, Cumbria

References

Villages in Cumbria
Murton, Cumbria